"Lethal Industry" is a single which appeared in DJ Tiësto's first album. Before the album was created he released several singles to see what the popularity and the reaction of his audience would be towards these tracks. He first released "Lethal Industry" in 1999, only three copies were made, the track was cut by 777 Mastering and released in an Acetate 12" vinyl by VC Recordings in UK.

It was officially first released in 2001 and with his next song "Suburban Train" as a B-side only available in Netherlands. In 2002 a "Lethal Live Mix" was released, it was a combination of the Fred Numf vs. Etienne Overdijk remix, Mauro Picotto remix, and Svenson & Gielen remix. The Radio Edit of Lethal Industry was edited by Cor Fijneman, he is not credited the edit since it is the same as the original track in its radio version, the Live Edit was recorded by Dutch Dimension at Tiësto Solo Amsterdam on 2 February 2002.

Tiësto has played "Lethal Industry" along Mason in live performances of the Tiësto in Concert 2, he became the first DJ to include a violin, and a classical instrument along a turntable. It was also included in his third studio album, Parade of the Athletes which was created due to Tiësto's success in the 2004 Summer Olympic Games. Tiësto mixed Lethal Industry with Marco V's tracks "Godd", and created "Lethal Godd", which has become very popular due to the lyrics it contains. In 2006, DJ Richard Durand remixed two songs from Tiësto, "Lethal Industry" and the trance anthem "Flight 643", Tiësto included Richard Durand's remix of "Flight 643" in his Copenhagen: Elements of Life World Tour. The music video is taken from Tiësto in Concert 2, the version includes Mason and became a great success, bringing the song higher in the chart positions.

The tune used in "Lethal Industry" was created by Alec Empire in 1992: Alec Empire – SuEcide, Alec Empire – Sueside (Junkie Remix 1995).

Formats and track listings

CD, maxi singles
Netherlands maxi-single
 "Lethal Industry" 
 "Lethal Industry" 
 "Lethal Industry" 
 "Lethal Industry" 
 "Lethal Industry" 
 "Lethal Industry" 

Germany maxi-single
 "Lethal Industry" 
 "Lethal Industry" 
 "Lethal Industry" 
 "Lethal Industry" 
 "Lethal Industry" 
 "Lethal Industry" 

United Kingdom maxi-single
 "Lethal Industry" 
 "Lethal Industry"

12" vinyl

Magik Muzik 12" vinyl
 "Lethal Industry" 
 "Lethal Industry" 

VC Recordings 12" vinyl
 "Lethal Industry" 
 "Lethal Industry" 

VC Recordings 12" vinyl
 "Lethal Industry" 
 "Lethal Industry" 

VC Recordings 12" vinyl
 "Lethal Industry" 
 "Lethal Industry" 

VC Recordings promo CD
 "Lethal Industry" 

Dos Or Die Recordings 12" vinyl
 "Lethal Industry" 
 "Lethal Industry" 
 "Lethal Industry" 

Dos Or Die Recordings 12" vinyl
 "Lethal Industry" 
 "Lethal Industry" 

Electropolis 12" 2 x vinyl
 "Lethal Industry" 
 "Lethal Industry" 
 "Lethal Industry" 
 "Lethal Industry" 

Electropolis 12" vinyl
 "Lethal Industry" 
 "Lethal Industry" 
 "Lethal Industry" 

Richard Durand Remixes
 "Lethal Industry" 
 "Flight 643" 

Nebula Classics 12" vinyl
 "Lethal Industry" 
 "Lethal Industry" 

Independence Records, Universal Licensing Music (ULM) 12" vinyl
 "Lethal Industry" 
 "Lethal Industry" 

Sublogic Corporation 12" vinyl
 "Lethal Industry" 

Jorn van Deynhoven Remix
 "Lethal Industry" (Jorn van Deynhoven Remix) – 5:32

Remixes

Sebastien Bruce Remix-single
 "Lethal Industry" 

Sterbinszky & Coddie Remix-single
 "Lethal Industry" 
 "Lethal Industry" 

Hardwell Remix-digital download
 "Lethal Industry" 

Scot Project Remix-unreleased
 "Lethal Industry"

Charts

Weekly charts

Year-end charts

Official versions
 a98 Remix (7:50)
 Album Version (6:46)
 Fred Numf vs. Etienne Overdijk Remix (7:40)
 Lethal Edit (2:05)
 Lethal Live Mix (17:50)
 Live Edit (2:53)
 Live performance by Mason (7:32)
 Mauro Picotto Remix (7:50)
 Original Mix (6:45)
 Radio Edit (2:45)
 DJ Richard & John Bass Remix (6:39)
 Richard Durand Remix (8:48)
 Sphaera Remix (8:39)
 CJ Stone Meets Mr. Phillips Remix (6:46)
 Svenson & Gielen Remix (7:05)
 Sunnery James & Ryan Marciano Original (7:08)
 Sunnery James & Ryan Marciano Original – TV Noise Remix (4:32)
 Sterbinszky & Coddie Remix – Part 1 (6:55)
 Sterbinszky & Coddie Remix – Part 2 (7:03)
 Sebastien Bruce Remix (5:58)
 Hardwell Remix (4:29)
 GTA 2013 Rerub (5:37)
 Jorn van Deynhoven Remix (5:32)
 KEVU Festival Remix (4:22)

Release history

References

Tiësto songs
2001 songs
Songs written by Tiësto